Rear Admiral Evert Groenewald is a retired South African Navy officer, who served as Chief of Naval Operations before his retirement in 1999.

He joined the Navy in 1963 at the South African Naval College and later obtained a BMil (BSc) at the South African Military Academy

He commanded the submarines  and 

He served as Chief of Naval Staff Intelligence as a Commodore and on 1 May 1996 was promoted to rear admiral and appointed Chief of Naval Operations.

He retired in 1999 and the post of Chief of Naval Operations was re-organised into Flag Officer Fleet during a Navy restructuring.

References

South African admirals
Living people
Submarine commanders
Year of birth missing (living people)